Ranelagh is a station of the Paris Métro on the Rue de Ranelagh. The station opened on 8 November 1922 with the opening of the first section of the line from Trocadéro to Exelmans.

The street of Rue de Ranelagh was named after Lord Ranelagh, an Irish peer and amateur musician, who built a rotunda for concerts in his park, Ranelagh Gardens, in Chelsea in 1750 and after whom the affluent Dublin suburb of Ranelagh is named. A similar establishment, the Jardin du Ranelagh was established on the grounds of the Château de la Muette in 1774. The place was fashionable under Marie Antoinette, under the Directory and then again under the Restoration. It disappeared in 1858 with the creation of the Bois de Boulogne.

Station layout 

Paris Métro stations in the 16th arrondissement of Paris
Railway stations in France opened in 1922